Andrea Czanik (born 29 October 1979) is a handball player for DJK/MJC Trier and the Slovak national team. Her nationality is Slovakia.

References

1979 births
Living people
Slovak female handball players
Slovak expatriate sportspeople in Germany